Gino Orlando, sometimes known as just Gino (September 3, 1929 – April 24, 2003), was an association footballer who played forward for the Brazil national team.

Career
Born in São Paulo, Gino Orlando started his career defending Palmeiras between 1948 and 1951. After defending Comercial in 1951 and in 1952, and XV de Jaú in 1951, he joined São Paulo in 1952, scoring 232 goals in 450 games, placing him as the club's second all-time top goalscorer, just behind Serginho Chulapa. During his spell at São Paulo, he won the Campeonato Paulista in 1953 and in 1957, and was the top goalscorer of the Torneio Rio-São Paulo in 1958, with 12 goals. He later played in 1963 and in 1964 for Portuguesa, retiring in 1966 while defending Juventus.

National team
Gino Orlando played nine games for the Brazil national team between 1956 and 1958, scoring three goals. He played his first game on April 1, 1956, against a Pernambuco state combined team. His first goal for Brazil was scored on April 8, 1956, against Portugal. The other two goals were scored on April 11, and on April 15, respectively against Switzerland and Austria. Gino Orlando played his last game for the national team on May 18, 1958, against Bulgaria.

Death
He died of cardiac arrest on April 24, 2003 at Hospital do Coração, in São Paulo.

Honors

Individual
Torneio Rio-São Paulo top goalscorer: 1958

Club
São Paulo
Campeonato Paulista: 1953, 1957

References

1929 births
2003 deaths
Brazilian footballers
Brazil international footballers
Sociedade Esportiva Palmeiras players
Esporte Clube XV de Novembro (Jaú) players
São Paulo FC players
Associação Portuguesa de Desportos players
Clube Atlético Juventus players
Footballers from São Paulo
Association football forwards